Maksim Stanislavovich Lepskiy (born 7 December 1985) is a Russian former professional football player.

External links
 Player page by sportbox.ru  
 
 

1985 births
Sportspeople from Stavropol
Living people
Russian footballers
FC Ufa players
FC Arsenal Tula players
Russian Premier League players
Association football midfielders
FC Dynamo Vologda players
FC Mashuk-KMV Pyatigorsk players